Pickup on 101 is a 1972 American drama film directed by John Florea and written by Anthony Blake. The film stars Jack Albertson, Lesley Ann Warren, Martin Sheen, Hal Baylor, George Chandler and Robert Donner. The film was released in May 1972, by American International Pictures.

Plot
An elderly wanderer, a sexy young girl running away from home and a folk singer looking for stardom hitch-hike their way cross-country, trying to get to California.

Cast       
Jack Albertson as Jedediah Bradley
Lesley Ann Warren as Nicky
Martin Sheen as Lester Baumgartner
Hal Baylor as Railroad cop
George Chandler as Pawnshop owner
Robert Donner as Jesse 
Eddie Firestone as Auto Mechanic
William Lally as Motorist
William Mims as Antique Shop Owner
Michael Ontkean as Chuck
Mike Road as Desk Sergeant
Don Spruance as Highway Patrolman
Harold J. Stone as 2nd Farmer
Buck Young as Car Family of Four
Peggy Stewart as Car Family of Four
Greg Young as Car Family of Four
Chuck Dorsett as Motorist
Kathleen Harper as Jesse's Wife
Earl Brown as R.R. Worker
Shayna Rockwell as 1st Waitress
Dorothy Brewer as Motel Maid
Shirley Hayward as Motel Family
Serina Rockwell as Motel Family
Rick Rockwell as Motel Family 
Sandra Rockwell as Motel Family

References

External links
 

1972 films
American drama films
1972 drama films
American International Pictures films
Films scored by Stu Phillips
1970s English-language films
Films directed by John Florea
1970s American films